This article is a list of episodes of the MTV series Liquid Television.

Liquid Television

Season 1 (1991–92)

Season 2 (1992)

Season 3 (1993–95)

Liquid Television Online

References

Liquid Television
Episodes